The domestic cat is a revered animal in Islam. Admired for their cleanliness, cats are considered "the quintessential pet" by Muslims.

Origins of reverence 

Cats have been venerated in the Near East since antiquity. Islam also has that tradition, albeit in a much modified form. According to many hadith, the Islamic prophet Muhammad prohibited the persecution and killing of cats.

One of Muhammad's companions was known as Abu Hurairah (literally: "Father of the Kitten") for his attachment to cats. Abu Hurairah reported that he had heard Muhammad declare that a pious woman went to Hell for after she had been annoyed by a female cat, tied her with a rope and neglected to provide her with food and water until she died. According to legend, Abu Saeed's cat saved Muhammad from a snake.

History 

The American poet and travel author Bayard Taylor (1825–1878) was astonished when he discovered a Syrian hospital where cats roamed freely. The institution, in which domestic felines were sheltered and nourished, was funded by a waqf, along with caretakers' wages, veterinary care and cat food. Edward William Lane (1801–1876), a British Orientalist who resided in Cairo, described a cat garden originally endowed by the 13th-century Egyptian sultan Baibars, whose European contemporaries held a very different attitude towards cats, eating them or killing them under papal decrees. 

Wilfred Thesiger, in his book The Marsh Arabs, notes that cats were allowed free entry to community buildings in villages in the Mesopotamian Marshes, and even fed. Aside from protecting granaries and food stores from pests, cats were valued by the paper-based Arab-Islamic cultures for preying on mice that destroyed books. For that reason, cats are often depicted in paintings alongside Islamic scholars and bibliophiles. The medieval Egyptian zoologist Al-Damiri (1344–1405) wrote that the first cat was created when God caused a lion to sneeze, after animals on Noah's Ark complained of mice.

Hygiene and neutering 
In Islamic tradition, cats are admired for their cleanliness. They are thought to be ritually clean, and are thus allowed to enter homes and even mosques, including Masjid al-Haram. Food sampled by cats is considered halal, in the sense that their consumption of the food does not make it impermissible for Muslims to eat, and water from which cats have drunk is permitted for wudu (the ablution that is done by Muslims). Furthermore, there is a belief among some Muslims that cats seek out people who are praying.

Muslim scholars are divided on the issue of neutering animals. Most, however, maintain that neutering cats is allowed "if there is some benefit in neutering the cat and if that will not cause its death". Muhammad ibn al Uthaymeen, a 20th-century Saudi Arabian Sunni imam, preached:

Muezza 

Many Muslims believe that Muezza (or) was Muhammad's favorite cat. Muhammad awoke one day to the sounds of the adhan. Preparing to attend prayer, he began to dress himself; however, he soon discovered his cat Muezza sleeping on the sleeve of his prayer robe. Rather than wake her, he used a pair of scissors to cut the sleeve off, leaving the cat undisturbed. Another story is, upon returning from the mosque, Muhammad received a bow from Muezza. He then smiled and gently stroked his beloved cat three times, giving all cats the ability to land squarely on their feet. There is no mention of any such cat or the associated story in the hadith or supplementary works and there are similar stories attributed to someone else from 6th century Arabia which may explain the origin of the story.

See also

Cats in ancient Egypt
Cultural depictions of cats
Feral cats in Istanbul
Human interaction with cats
Islam and dogs
Moral status of animals in the ancient world

References

External links
History of the Cat in Islam

Cats as pets
Animals in Islam
Cat folklore